Neeyum Naanum is a 2010 Tamil language musical dance film written, produced and directed by S. V. Solairaja. The film stars Sanjeev and newcomer Chetna Pande, with Sampath Raj, Vadhan, Rinson Simon, Master Sachin, Anju, Manobala, Singamuthu and Halwa Vasu playing supporting roles. The film had musical score by Sriram Vijay and was released on 27 August 2010.

Plot

The film begins Surya (Sanjeev) joining a school as an aerobics instructor. That school is owned by Sampath (Sampath Raj) who is the chairman of a group of institutions and also a very influential person. Surya then befriends with Sampath's niece Diya (Chetna Pande), and he helps the poor student Karthik (Rinson Simon) get admission in the school. In the meantime, Karthik's mother falls ill and Karthik needs to find money for her operation. He decides to enter an inter-collegiate dance competition that carries prize money. At a dance practice session, Surya is impressed by the rookie Karthik and  wants him to be the main dancer of their school, but Siddharth (Master Sachin), a spoiled brat and Sampath's son, is irritated by his decision. The class is split into two teams: one led by Karthik and the other by Siddharth. One day, Karthik's mother is in serious condition in the hospital and Karthik cannot attend the pre-selection session; thus, his team is disqualified. Meanwhile, Surya and Diya fall in love with each other, but Diya gets engaged to Sampath's brother Arun (Vadhan).

Both Karthik and Surya leave the school and form a dancing team composed of poor slum kids. Surya and Diya continue to meet each other, and Sampath convinces Arun to forget her. At the intercollegiate dance competition, both Karthik's team and Siddharth's team qualify to the finals. During the finals, Karthik faints backstage, but he manages to wake up and to dance on stage. Karthik's team eventually wins the competition.

Cast

Sanjeev as Surya
Chetna Pande as Diya
Sampath Raj as Sampath
Vadhan as Arun
Rinson Simon as Karthik
Master Sachin as Siddharth
Anju as Sunitha, Sampath's wife
Manobala
Singamuthu as Singamuthu
Halwa Vasu as Vasu
Muthukaalai as Bus conductor
Krishnamoorthy as Bus driver
Nellai Siva as Nellai
Kumaresan as Ganesan
Theni Murugan as Auto rickshaw driver
Senthi Kumari as Karthik's mother
Shobana
George Maryan
Pasi Sathya as Rakkamma
Ammu Ramachandran as Host

Production
Director S. V. Solairaja, who had directed more than 7000 TV serial episodes in many languages, made his directorial debut with Neeyum Naanum under the banner of Team Visions. Sanjeev who acted in Kulir 100° (2009) was selected to play the hero while Chetna Pande, national level badminton player, was chosen to play the heroine. Music baton was wielded by Sriram Vijay, S. Ashok Mehta took care of the editing and the cinematography was by Prem Shankar. The film was shot in 35 mm film camera and the audio was released in 3D.

Soundtrack

The film score and the soundtrack were composed by Sriram Vijay. The soundtrack features 7 tracks written by Piraisoodan, Palani Bharathi, Sriram Vijay and Wattabottles. The audio was launched on 19 May 2010 by actress Khushbu at South Indian Film Chamber of Commerce in Chennai. V. C. Guhanathan, Pandiarajan, R. K. Selvamani and T. G. Thyagarajan attended the audio launch.

Release
The film was released on 27 August 2010 alongside five other films.

Critical reception
Behindwoods.com rated the film 1.5 out of 5 and said, "We have yet another movie which is predictable and makes you yawn. More so because this one involves school going kids. The direction and screenplay have a lot of loopholes. The one thing which makes an exception in the movie is the choreography of a couple of dance sequences". S. R. Ashok Kumar from The Hindu wrote, "Director Solairaja has worked a lot on television, and still has a long way to go in films. But, his effort in portraying school children, and their life, with its share of egos and friendships, is commendable.". A reviewer from The New Indian Express stated, "The better moments in the film are the scenes where Surya selects his team and prepares them. The dance scenes were also ably executed. Otherwise, there is nothing novel about the script or its treatment". Another reviewer rated the film 2.75 out of 5 and said, "Since it deals with the dance competition of the kids, the energy levels are good but then the consistency was not maintained throughout the film [..] The film would have scored well if there was some depth in the scenes and few twists added to it".

Box office
The film took an average opening at the Chennai box office.

References

External links

2010 films
2010s Tamil-language films
Indian dance films
Indian children's films
Indian musical films
2010 directorial debut films